Alyson Rae Stoner (born August 11, 1993) is an American actress, singer, and dancer. Her film roles include Cheaper by the Dozen (2003), Cheaper by the Dozen 2 (2005), and the Step Up franchise (2006–2014). Her television roles include serving as the host of Disney Channel's Mike's Super Short Show (2001–2007), playing Max in The Suite Life of Zack & Cody (2005–2007), voicing Isabella Garcia-Shapiro in Phineas and Ferb (2007–2015), and portraying Caitlyn in Camp Rock (2008) and Camp Rock 2: The Final Jam (2010).

Stoner has been a background dancer for several artists including Missy Elliott, Eminem, Kumbia Kings, Outkast, and Will Smith. She lent her voice to the Kingdom Hearts franchise (2008–2020) and the Holly Hobbie & Friends series of animated television specials (2006–2008). She has also released twelve singles and two extended plays.

Early life
Stoner was born in Toledo, Ohio, the daughter of LuAnne Hodges (née Adams), a former executive secretary at Owens-Illinois, and Charlie Stoner. While growing up in Toledo, Stoner attended Maumee Valley Country Day School and studied ballet, tap dance, and jazz dance at the O'Connell's Dance Studio. She also modeled and trained at the Margaret O'Brien Modeling Studio. She won Best Model of the Year at the International Modeling and Talent Association Convention in New York City under O'Brien's studio in 2000.

Career

Acting and singing
In 2001, Stoner became the co-host of the Disney Channel Mike's Super Short Show along with Michael Alan Johnson, an infomercial segment regarding forthcoming Disney releases. In 2003 and 2005, she appeared as Sarah, one of the twelve Baker children, in the successful comedies Cheaper by the Dozen and Cheaper by the Dozen 2. She has also appeared in several television shows aimed at the preteen audience, including The Suite Life of Zack & Cody, That's So Raven and Drake & Josh.

In 2006, she had a small film role in Step Up as Camille, Channing Tatum's character's younger foster sister. She provided the voice of Isabella Garcia-Shapiro and Jenny (until Season 4) in the Disney Channel animated series Phineas and Ferb from 2007 to 2015. In 2008, she starred in the Disney Channel Original movie Camp Rock as Caitlyn Gellar, an aspiring music producer. Her reception in Camp Rock was particularly strong, with various media outlets suggesting it was about time she played a main character role having backed up for other big names such as Will Smith and Eminem. Stoner starred as Alice McKinley in the movie Alice Upside Down, based loosely on the Alice series, particularly The Agony of Alice by Phyllis Reynolds Naylor. This was her second starring role and, according to an interview that appears on the direct-to-DVD release, she states that this was the first time she has had to appear in every scene in a movie.

In 2008, she sang two songs, "Lost and Found" and "Free Spirit", from the soundtrack of the movie Alice Upside Down, in which she plays the lead role. She has also recorded a cover version of the song Dancing in the Moonlight for the 2009 Disney DVD/Blu-ray movie, Space Buddies. In 2010, Stoner appeared in the third Step Up film Step Up 3D opposite Adam Sevani where she reprised the role. Stoner uploaded a video onto her official YouTube page of her final dance rehearsal which introduced other cast members. The same year, Stoner returned to reprise her role as Caitlyn Gellar in Camp Rock 2: The Final Jam, a sequel to Camp Rock. Stoner also guest-starred in the television drama series House as a skater.

In 2011, Stoner started working with record producers, songwriters and a vocal coach to change her vocal style from "kiddie-pop" to a more soulful pop vibe with a little alternative edge for her first studio album. On April 4, 2010, Stoner posted a video to her YouTube Channel announcing the release of her debut single "Flying Forward" on April 20, 2010. Stoner released her debut EP entitled Beat the System in 2011. She also appeared in Wii Fit related videos on the Nintendo Channel on the Wii video game console demonstrating balance exercises. Stoner replaced Hayden Panettiere as the voice of Kairi in Kingdom Hearts Re:Chain of Memories, Xion in Kingdom Hearts 358/2 Days, and both characters in Kingdom Hearts III. She voiced the character Opal in seasons three and four of The Legend of Korra.

Dancing
After choreography training in Los Angeles, Stoner appeared as a backup dancer in several music videos, notably Missy Elliott's "Work It", "Gossip Folks", "I'm Really Hot", Eminem's "Just Lose It", and "No Tengo Dinero" by the Kumbia Kings. She has also been a backup dancer for Outkast at the 2004 Kids' Choice Awards and for Will Smith at the 2005 show. Stoner danced with a dancing group called The JammX Kids between 2003 and 2006. She quit the group in early 2006 due to scheduling conflicts, but continues to work with the individual kids on different jobs. She was also one of the dancers in the special features for the Shark Tale DVD.

Stoner teaches hip hop classes at the Millennium Dance Complex, and is credited as the youngest person to teach a master class there. She also appeared in Debby Ryan's "We Got the Beat" for Disney Channel's Radio Rebel. In February 2015, she released a dance tribute video to Missy Elliot featuring a mash up medley of Missy Elliott videos she had danced in when she was younger. Within the first week, it received more than 12 million views. Missy Elliott invited Alyson to perform "Work It" with her at the 2019 MTV Video Music Awards.

Publishing
Stoner was the "dance editor" for KEWL Magazine. In February 2009, Stoner released the Alyson Stoner Project described as "a dance video hybrid — melding many styles of entertainment into one package". It was directed by Kevin Schmidt, her co-star from Cheaper by the Dozen.

Personal life

Sexuality
In March 2018, Stoner came out in an article on Teen Vogue, stating she was "attracted to men, women, and people who identify in other ways." Later that year she stated in an interview "I don't feel comfortable labeling my sexual orientation or even faith at the moment."

Health
Stoner has been open about her struggles with mental health and disordered eating. According to Stoner, she first developed anxiety at age 6 due to the high-stress environment of working in the entertainment industry with symptoms including heart palpitations, hair loss, and seizures. 

In 2011, at age 17, she was hospitalized and checked herself into rehab facility for eating disorders, having struggled with anorexia, bulimia, and binge eating disorder for years. She credits therapy for assisting in her recovery.

Filmography

Film

Television

Web

Video games

Discography

Extended plays

Singles

Featured singles

Other appearances

Awards and nominations

References

External links 

 
 
 Alyson Stoner interview from Portrait magazine.

1993 births
Living people
21st-century American actresses
21st-century American singers
21st-century American women singers
Actresses from Toledo, Ohio
American child actresses
American child singers
American female dancers
American film actresses
American television actresses
American voice actresses
American LGBT actors
LGBT actresses
LGBT dancers
LGBT people from Ohio
American LGBT singers
Maumee Valley Country Day School alumni
Musicians from Toledo, Ohio